Camden is an unincorporated town and Census-designated place in Camden County, North Carolina, United States. It is the county seat of Camden County, a consolidated city-county. As of the 2010 census, the Camden town had a population of 599.

Camden is located on the eastern banks of the Pasquotank River, across from which lies Elizabeth City. It currently has two traffic lights, and is centered at the intersection of U.S. Highway 158 and North Carolina Highway 343. It boasts five schools: Grandy Primary School, Camden Intermediate School, Camden Middle School, Camden County High, and Camtech Early College High School.

Camden is part of the Elizabeth City, North Carolina Micropolitan Statistical Area.

The Camden County Courthouse, Camden County Jail, Lamb-Ferebee House, and Milford are listed on the National Register of Historic Places.

Demographics

2020 census

As of the 2020 United States census, there were 620 people, 274 households, and 206 families residing in the town.

References

Census-designated places in North Carolina
Census-designated places in Camden County, North Carolina
County seats in North Carolina